The discography of Korean-American rapper and singer Jay Park consists of five studio albums, eight extended plays, twenty-seven singles,  and more.

Following Park's departure from 2PM, he uploaded a cover of B.o.B.'s "Nothin' on You" onto his YouTube account, with rap and lyrics written by himself. This led Warner Music Korea to release his first EP, Count on Me (Revised Romanization: Mideojullae). The EP peaked at number one on the Gaon chart.

In 2011, Park released his first Korean mini-album Take a Deeper Look, consisting of seven songs, mainly written and composed by himself. In the United States, the album debuted at number three on the Billboard World Albums chart and at number twenty six on the Billboard Heatseekers Albums chart. The mini-album sold over 50,000 copies in 5 days after its release on April 27, 2012. On January 11, 2012, Park received the Disk Bonsang for Take a Deeper Look on the first day of the 26th Golden Disk Awards, and was the only solo artist to receive a Bonsang.

In 2012, Park released his first full-length Korean album New Breed, which sold over 100,000 copies in a month. The album debuted at number four on the Billboard World Albums chart and at number sixteen on the Billboard Heatseekers Albums chart. The album peaked at number one on the Gaon Chart. Park released an English mixtape, Fresh Air: Breathe It, in a run up to his APAHM tour in the USA. The mixtape became the first mixtape by an Asian artist to have gold status on DatPiff by surpassing 100,000 downloads.

Early in 2013, Park released a free-download English rap track, "Appetizer", produced by Cha Cha Malone, in addition to a music video on his YouTube channel. In April 2013, Park released a digital single entitled "Joah", a rap track featuring Dok2. Park's fourth album Everything You Wanted, released in 2016, charted at number three on Billboards World Albums chart.

Albums

Studio albums

Mixtapes

Extended plays

Singles

As lead artist

Promotional singles

As a featured artist

Other charted songs

Soundtrack appearances

Music videos

Other appearances

As a songwriter/producer/composer

Notes

See also
 Jay Park videography

References

External links
 
  at SidusHQ 
 

Discography
Discographies of South Korean artists
K-pop discographies
Hip hop discographies